Charles Asa Francis (1855–1934) was an American politician from Monmouth County, New Jersey.

Background
Francis was born on October 28, 1855 in Adelphia, New Jersey. He died on April 18, 1934 in Long Branch, New Jersey and was buried in Old First Methodist Church Cemetery in West Long Branch

Career
After serving for two terms in the New Jersey General Assembly, Francis served in the New Jersey Senate from 1897 to 1902, his final year as president.

Having previously served as council-member, Francis became the first Mayor of Long Branch, New Jersey under the reincorporation of Long Branch as a city on April 8, 1903.

He served as Sheriff of Monmouth County from 1903 to 1906.

He served as treasurer of the county in the 14 years preceding his death.

References 

1855 births
1934 deaths
Members of the New Jersey General Assembly
Presidents of the New Jersey Senate
Sheriffs of Monmouth County, New Jersey
Mayors of Long Branch, New Jersey
People from Howell Township, New Jersey